Leiaster is a genus of echinoderms belonging to the family Ophidiasteridae.

The genus has almost cosmopolitan distribution.

Species:

Leiaster coriaceus 
Leiaster glaber 
Leiaster leachi 
Leiaster speciosus 
Leiaster teres

References

Ophidiasteridae
Asteroidea genera